Lincoln Kilpatrick (February 12, 1931 – May 18, 2004) was an American film, television, and stage actor.

Biography

Career
Born in St. Louis, Missouri, Kilpatrick attended Lincoln University and earned a degree in drama before he began acting. Encouraged by Billie Holiday, Kilpatrick began his career in 1959 in the Broadway production of A Raisin in the Sun. In the 1960s, he mainly guest-starred in television roles and bit parts in movies. His primary acting talents were showcased in stage and theater work, which he remained active in until his death. Kilpatrick was co-founder of the Kilpatrick-Cambridge Theatre Arts School in Hollywood, California. He was also the first African-American member of the Lincoln Center Repertory Company.

Personal life and death
Kilpatrick was married 47 years to the singer and stage performer Helena Ferguson from 1957 until his death from lung cancer in 2004. Kilpatrick had five children: actor and composer Lincoln Kilpatrick Jr.; writer, director and actor DaCarla Kilpatrick; actor and director Erik Kilpatrick; actor Jozella Reed; and producer Marjorie L. Kilpatrick. He was buried at the Forest Lawn, Hollywood Hills Cemetery in Los Angeles.

Filmography

References

External links
 
 
 

1931 births
2004 deaths
Lincoln University (Missouri) alumni
American male film actors
American male stage actors
Male actors from St. Louis
Deaths from lung cancer in California
Burials at Forest Lawn Memorial Park (Hollywood Hills)
African-American male actors
American male television actors
20th-century American male actors
20th-century African-American people
21st-century African-American people